Dmitri Vadimovich Golubev (born 1 March 1992) is a Russian professional football player. He plays for FC Mashuk-KMV Pyatigorsk.

Club career
He made his debut in the Russian Premier League on 11 March 2012 for FC Krylia Sovetov Samara in a game against FC Rostov. In the summer 2013 he was loaned out to Mordovia Saransk and played there for the first half of the 2013–14 season.

References

External links
 
 Career summary by sportbox.ru

1992 births
People from Orenburg Oblast
Living people
Russian footballers
Russia youth international footballers
Russia under-21 international footballers
Association football defenders
Russian Premier League players
PFC Krylia Sovetov Samara players
FC Mordovia Saransk players
FC Luch Vladivostok players
FC Yenisey Krasnoyarsk players
FC Nizhny Novgorod (2015) players
FC Zenit-Izhevsk players
FC Yevpatoriya players
FC Nosta Novotroitsk players
FC Mashuk-KMV Pyatigorsk players
Sportspeople from Orenburg Oblast